

See also
 Maneuver (disambiguation)
 Supermaneuverability